Stansfeld is an English surname deriving from the Old English 'stan' (meaning stony) and 'feld' (field). This toponymic surname originates from the ancient township of Stansfield (near Todmorden, West Yorkshire), which was listed in the Domesday Book of 1086 as 'Stanesfelt’. The surname is most commonly found around the town of Todmorden, West Yorkshire.

Notable people with this surname include:

Stansfeld (surname)
 Anthony Stansfeld (b.1945), English Conservative politician and Thames Valley Police and Crime Commissioner
 Caroline Ashurst Stansfeld (1816–89), English activist and wife of James Stansfeld
 James Stansfeld (1820–98), English Liberal politician and President of the Local Government Board
 James Rawdon Stansfeld (1866–1936), English army officer
 John Stansfeld (1855–1939), English Anglican priest, physician, and founder of Stansfeld Oxford and Bermondsey Club Football Club
 John Raymond Evelyn Stansfeld (1880–1915), English army officer
 Margaret Stansfeld (1860–1951), English educator, and founder and Principal  of the Bedford Physical Training College
 Thomas Wolryche Stansfeld (1877–1935), English army officer

Stansfeld (given name)
 Grey Owl or Archibald Stansfeld Belaney (1888–1938), British writer and environmentalism (also known as Grey Owl)
 Charles Stansfeld Jones or Charles Robert Stansfeld Jones (1886–1950), English accountant, occultist and ceremonial magician (also known as Frater Ashad)
 Timothy Stansfeld Engleheart (1803–79), English engraver

See also
 Stansfield, West Yorkshire
 Stansfield (surname)
 Stansfield (disambiguation)
 Field House, Sowerby
 Dunninald Castle

References

English-language surnames
Surnames of English origin
Surnames of British Isles origin